This article contains information about the literary events and publications of 1785.

Events
January 1
The Daily Universal Register (later The Times) is first published, in London.
The Paris theatre company Théâtre des Variétés-Amusantes moves to a temporary new building in the gardens of the Palais-Royal.
February 2 – Sarah Siddons makes her London debut in her most famous rôle, Lady Macbeth, at the Theatre Royal, Drury Lane.
February – The English heiress Mary Bowes escapes from her husband, Andrew Robinson Stoney, and begins divorce proceedings.
April 14 – After today's death of the English poet William Whitehead in London, Thomas Warton succeeds him as Poet Laureate of Great Britain, William Mason having refused the post.
May 22 – Robert Burns' first child, Elizabeth ("Dear-bought Bess"), is born to his mother's servant, Elizabeth Paton.
June 23 – The Litvak rabbi and writer Aryeh Leib ben Asher Gunzberg dies at Metz in France after a book-case topples on him, according to tradition.
November 28 – The Marquis de Sade finishes writing The 120 Days of Sodom (Les 120 Journées de Sodome) while imprisoned in the Bastille; it will not be published until 1904.
unknown date
Giacomo Casanova is appointed librarian to Count Joseph Karl von Waldstein at the Duchcov Château in Bohemia.
A new building for the Prussian Royal Library is completed in Berlin.

New books

Fiction
Anna Maria Bennett – Anna
Elizabeth Blower – Maria
Denis Diderot, part trans. Johann Wolfgang von Goethe – Jacques the Fatalist (Jacques der Fatalist und sein Herr)
Richard Graves – Eugenius
Karl Philipp Moritz – Anton Reiser (to 1790)

Children
Rudolf Erich Raspe, anonymously – Baron Munchausen's Narrative of his Marvellous Travels and Campaigns in Russia

Drama
George Colman the Younger – Two to One
Richard Cumberland – The Natural Son
Elizabeth Inchbald – Appearance Is Against Them
John O'Keefe – The Poor Soldier
Emanuel Schikaneder – Der Fremde

Poetry

János Bacsanyi – The Valour of the Magyars
Samuel Egerton Brydges – Sonnets and other Poems
Robert Burns – "To a Mouse"
William Combe – The Royal Dream
William Cowper – The Task
George Crabbe – The News-Paper
William Hayley – A Philosophical, Historical and Moral Essay on Old Maids
Samuel Johnson – The Poetical Works
Friedrich Schiller – Ode to Joy (An die Freude)
Charles Wilkins (translator) – Bhagvat-geeta, or Dialogues of Kreeshna and Arjoon
John Wolcot as "Peter Pindar"
The Lousiad
Lyric Odes, for the Year 1785
Ann Yearsley – Poems

Non-fiction
Ethan Allen – Reason: the Only Oracle of Man
James Boswell – The Journal of a Tour to the Hebrides with Samuel Johnson, LL.D.
Edmund Burke – Speech on the Nabob of Arcot's Debts
Francis Grose – A Classical Dictionary of the Vulgar Tongue
Samuel Johnson – Prayers and Meditations
Immanuel Kant – Groundwork of the Metaphysic of Morals (Grundlegung zur Metaphysik der Sitten)
William Paley – The Principles of Moral and Political Philosophy
Clara Reeve – The Progress of Romance
Thomas Reid – Essays on the Intellectual Powers of Man
John Scott – Critical Essays on Some of the Poems of Several English Poets

Births
January 4 – Jakob Grimm, German philologist, jurist and mythologist (died 1863)
January 31 – Magdalena Dobromila Rettigová, Czech cookery writer (died 1845)
March 3 – Frances Mary Richardson Currer, English heiress and bibliophile (died 1861)
March 7 – Alessandro Manzoni, Italian poet and novelist (died 1873)
March 18 – He Changling (賀長齡), Chinese scholar and writer on governance (died 1848)
March 21 – Henry Kirke White, English poet (died 1806)
April 4 – Bettina von Arnim, German novelist (died 1859)
April 7 – Lorenzo Hammarsköld, Swedish poet and author (died 1827)
May 3 – Vicente López y Planes, Argentine politician and writer (died 1856)
May 18 – John Wilson (Christopher North), Scottish writer (died 1854)
August 15 – Thomas De Quincey, English essayist (died 1859)
October 18 – Thomas Love Peacock, English novelist, poet and East India Company official (died 1866)
October 30 – Hermann, Fürst von Pückler-Muskau – German travel and gardening writer (died 1871)

Deaths
January 19 – Jonathan Toup, English classicist, critic and cleric (born 1713)
April 14 – William Whitehead, English poet laureate (born 1715)
May 4 – János Sajnovics, Hungarian linguist (born 1733)
August 31 – Pietro Chiari, Italian playwright, novelist and librettist (born 1712)
September 17 – Antoine Léonard Thomas, French poet and critic (born 1732)
November 12 – Richard Burn, English legal writer (born 1709)
November 25 – Richard Glover, English poet and politician (born 1712)
December 6 – Kitty Clive, English actress and writer of farce (born 1711)
December 18 – Joseph Allegranza, Milanese historian (born 1715)
December 29 – Johan Herman Wessel, Norwegian-born Danish poet and satirist (born 1742)
unknown date – Ali Haider Multani, Punjabi Sufi poet (born 1690)

References

 
Years of the 18th century in literature